Genghis Khan (or Ang Buhay ni Genghis Khan) is a 1950 Filipino biopic film
directed by Manuel Conde, based on the life of Mongol ruler and emperor Genghis Khan. It was the earliest film to depict the Khan's life.

Genghis Khan is considered a classic, The film was given a technical achievement citation upon its debut at the 1952 Venice Film Festival. It also was shown at the 1952 Edinburgh Film Festival.

Cast 
Manuel Conde as Temujin / Genghis Khan
Elvira Reyes as Lei Hu
Inday Jalandoni as Burchou
Jose Villafranca
Lou Salvador as Burchou
Don Dano as Darmo Acosta
Africa Dela Rosa
Ric Bustamante
Ely Nakpil
Johnny Monteiro
Andres Centenera
Leon Lizares

Directional credit 
As seen in the original posters, Manuel Conde shares directional credit with Lou Salvador as a concession to the actor for agreeing to shave his head for his villain role as Burchou. Despite this, Conde had the full control in directing the film and Salvador didn't have a single directional input towards the film. New re-releases of the film now remove Salvador's directional credit and only bear Conde's name in the posters.

Production
Genghis Khan was directed by Manuel Conde and was produced under his own studio Manuel Conde (MC) Productions. The film had a limited budget and equipment used for production was outdated even at that time. Due to cost-cutting measures, Conde used calesa horses which had smaller built compared to horses used in Western films. The film was made in black and white and has a duration of 88 minutes.

Conde as Manuel Urbano also did the film's screenplay. Botong Francisco, who is better known for his murals, was also involved in Genghis Khan as its production designer. Other members of the production team include Emmanuel Rojas (cinematographer), Rex Heinze (editor), Flaviano Villareal (sound) and Juan Silos Jr. (music).

Release
Genghis Khan was released at the 1952 Venice Film Festival.

Reception
Genghis Khan was praised for its technical aspects although it was also found to be too graphic and violent by critics of that time. Conde was praised for being "authentic" by devising small-built horses which was believed to be closer to the actual breed of horses used by Genghis Khan which is now extinct.

See also 
 List of Asian historical drama films

References

External links 
Genghis Khan at IMDB

1950 films
Philippine epic films
Films set in Mongolia
Philippine biographical films
Depictions of Genghis Khan on film
Films set in the 12th century
1950s biographical films
Philippine black-and-white films